is a Japanese light novel series written by Bokuto Uno and illustrated by Ruria Miyuki. ASCII Media Works have published the series since September 2018 under their Dengeki Bunko imprint. A manga adaptation with art by Sakae Esuno has been serialized in Kadokawa Shoten's shōnen manga magazine Monthly Shōnen Ace since May 2019. Both the light novel and manga are licensed in North America by Yen Press. An anime television series adaptation by J.C.Staff is set to premiere in July 2023.

Plot
Springtime at Kimberly Magic Academy brings a new batch of first-year students. Among this year's batch is a one Oliver Horn, a boy with a mission burning in his chest. His objective is to exact vengeance on the members of Kimberly's faculty that brutally murdered his mother, however, when he meets a samurai girl from the distant nation of Yamatsu, Oliver is trapped between his mission and his curiosity with the samurai girl, Nanao Hibiya. Alongside her, Oliver meets several other students that he becomes fast friends with, however, will these friendships prove detrimental to Oliver's vendetta? More importantly, as introduced to him and the rest of the first-years during the entrance ceremony, Kimberly Academy has never once seen a school year without a single student death. Can Oliver and his friends survive these seven years of hell?

Characters

 A jack-of-all-trades mage and the son of "Two Blade" Chloe Halford, Oliver is a down-to-earth person with a level head. He always tries pursuing friendly conclusions to fights but is able to pick up his wand and athame if he has no other choice but to do so. His true purpose for attending Kimberly is to murder the members of Kimberly's faculty who had a hand in the death of his mother.

Media

Light novels
The light novel series is written by Bokuto Uno and illustrated by Ruria Miyuki. ASCII Media Works published the first volume under their Dengeki Bunko imprint on September 7, 2018. As of March 2023, eleven volumes have been released plus one side story book. The light novel series is licensed in North America by Yen Press.

Volume list

Manga
A manga adaptation, illustrated by Sakae Esuno, began serialization in Kadokawa Shoten's Monthly Shōnen Ace magazine on May 25, 2019. As of September 2022, six tankōbon volumes have been released. The manga series is also licensed in North America by Yen Press.

Volume list

Anime
An anime television series adaptation was announced during the live-streamed "Dengeki Bunko Winter Festival 2021" event on December 11, 2021. It is produced by J.C.Staff and directed by Masato Matsune, with scripts supervised by Shōgo Yasukawa, character designs handled by Sōta Suwa, and music composed by Kujira Yumemi. The series is set to premiere in July 2023.

Reception
The light novel series ranked first in 2020 in Takarajimasha's annual light novel guide book Kono Light Novel ga Sugoi!, in the bunkobon category.

See also
Alderamin on the Sky — Another light novel series by the same author.

References

External links
 
 
 

2018 Japanese novels
Anime and manga based on light novels
Dengeki Bunko
Fantasy anime and manga
Japanese fantasy novels
J.C.Staff
Kadokawa Dwango franchises
Kadokawa Shoten manga
Light novels
Shōnen manga
Upcoming anime television series
Yen Press titles